KUVS-DT (channel 19) is a television station licensed to Modesto, California, United States, broadcasting the Spanish-language Univision network to the Sacramento area. It is owned and operated by TelevisaUnivision USA alongside Stockton-licensed UniMás outlet KTFK-DT (channel 64). Both stations share studios on Arden Way near Cal Expo in Sacramento, while KUVS-DT's transmitter is located near Valley Springs, California.

KUVS-DT is one of the oldest Spanish-language TV stations in California, having gone on the air from Modesto as KLOC-TV in 1966 and adding Spanish-language programs in 1972. It was owned by Chester Smith, a country and western performer, and aired a hybrid Spanish and Christian program format under the KLOC-TV and KCSO call signs between 1972 and 1997, when Univision purchased the station. Most operations moved to Sacramento in 1998.

All of KUVS-DT's subchannels are rebroadcast in the immediate Sacramento area on KEZT-CD (channel 23), and KTFK-DT also rebroadcasts the Univision subchannel of KUVS-DT to provide improved coverage.

History

Chester Smith ownership
On March 3, 1964, Corbett Pierce and country and western performer Chester Smith, owner of KLOC (920 AM) in Ceres, applied to the Federal Communications Commission (FCC) for permission to build a new television station on channel 17 in Modesto, one of two channels allocated to the city. The FCC approved the application on November 12, 1964, and the station began as independent station KLOC-TV on August 26, 1966.

Initially, KLOC maintained a general-entertainment format and was one of the stations that carried programming from the United Network during its one month of operation in May 1967. About a year after its sign-on, the syndicators providing KLOC's programming raised their prices to the levels closer to a Sacramento-licensed station (the station's owners had been acquired programming at lower rates closer to that of an unrated television market); KLOC-TV alleged that Stockton's KOVR had pressured syndicators not to do business with the Modesto station. Smith resorted to simulcasting KLOC radio's programming during the daytime hours, including a camera in the radio station's studios showing the disc jockeys live, and ran Spanish-language telenovelas in the evening, when the radio station signed off. In 1972, the station joined the Spanish International Network, predecessor to Univision; soon after came an affiliation with the Christian Broadcasting Network to air religious programs.

In 1975, the station increased its power and finally began broadcasting in color; the technical improvements also resulted in Sacramento being able to receive the station for the first time. Smith sought to expand the reach of his station's programming. In 1976, he proposed to build a satellite station on channel 42 in Concord, which had lay fallow for a decade following the short-lived existence of KCFT-TV a decade prior, with a transmitter to be built atop Mount Diablo. The move was roundly opposed by citizens' groups that felt that Concord's channel 42 should be reserved for a proposal with more local programming as well as KEMO-TV (channel 20) in San Francisco and KMUV-TV (channel 31) in Sacramento, whose formats then included many Spanish-language shows. As a result, KLOC abandoned the Concord proposal in December 1976. In 1979, KLOC won the rights to build channel 35 in Salinas, to repeat much of its Modesto programming to the Monterey Bay area; as a result, the KLOC radio station was sold off as a condition of obtaining the construction permit, and the television station changed its call sign to KCSO ("Chester Smith Organization") in 1981. KCBA started broadcasting on November 1, 1981, becoming an English-language independent station several years later. In 1986, KREN-TV went on the air as an SIN-affiliated sister station in Reno, Nevada. Later in the decade, K07TA and K09UF, predecessors to today's KTAS (channel 33), went on air in the Santa Barbara and San Luis Obispo area, and in 1991, plans were revealed for further stations in Merced and Eureka.

KCSO's primary local program was its 6 p.m. local newscast, which was produced on a "dental floss budget", in the words of Xóchitl Arellano, who worked at the station when it was still located in Modesto. However, the number of news personnel slowly increased throughout the 1990s.

Univision ownership
In late 1996, Smith announced the sale of KCSO to Univision for $40 million; once the sale closed, the station's morning Christian programs would be discontinued to make way for broadcasting all of Univision's output. (The KCSO call letters were retained by Smith, who started KCSO-LP, a Telemundo affiliate, in 1999.) Smith was paid in Univision stock, which quadrupled in value between 1997 and 1999.

Univision changed the call letters to KUVS, relocated operations from Modesto to Sacramento, and added a 11 p.m. local newscast to the station's longstanding 6 p.m. local news, which also began to cover news in Sacramento. It was the first time a network had placed an owned-and-operated TV station in Sacramento. Univision purchased a former bank building across from the Arden Fair Mall to house its Sacramento operation, leaving only sales and news personnel in Modesto.

Newscasts and other local programming
In 2017, Univision debuted a statewide  (Digital Edition) newscast, aired at 12:30 p.m.

KUVS also produces Voz y Voto, a weekly political roundtable program distributed to Univision's California stations. When it debuted in 1999, the program was produced at KMEX-TV in Los Angeles and was originally hosted by Rosa Maria Villalpando and Armando Botello, state political columnist for La Opinión.  It moved to Sacramento by 2005, when the program featured an exclusive interview with governor Arnold Schwarzenegger.

Technical information

Subchannels
The station's digital signal is multiplexed:

There is no 19.2 on this multiplex, as it is broadcast from KTFK-DT. KEZT-CD broadcasts the subchannels on this multiplex using major channel 23.

Though it does not host any additional subchannels, KUVS-DT is part of Sacramento's ATSC 3.0 (NextGen TV) deployment on KQCA, which began operating in July 2021.

Analog-to-digital conversion
KUVS-TV shut down its analog signal, over UHF channel 19, on June 12, 2009, as part of the federally mandated transition from analog to digital television. The station's digital signal remained on its pre-transition UHF channel 18.

References

Television channels and stations established in 1966
Bounce TV affiliates
Ion Mystery affiliates
1966 establishments in California
UVS-DT
UVS-DT
Modesto, California